Built in Brownsville, Pennsylvania, in 1857, the steam ship Lioness was purchased by the War Department and converted to a ram ship for Colonel Charles Ellet, Jr.'s United States Ram Fleet.  Commissioned in 1862, Lieutenant Warren D. Crandall in command, she joined the Union Mississippi River Squadron on the western rivers.

Service

After fitting out at Pittsburgh in April 1862, Lioness departed New Albany for Cairo, Illinois 12 May. Scouting Fort Pillow with other rams on 1 June, she participated on 6 June in the Battle of Memphis, a one-sided, Union victory. Lioness then joined other rams and three gunboats, convoying and covering army troops under Colonel Woods in a joint expedition from Helena to the Yazoo River, capturing the USS Fairplay, and destroying newly constructed Confederate batteries 20 miles up the Yazoo. The expedition also dispersed Confederate troops at Greenville, Mississippi, before retiring 27 August.

In December, Lioness was at Mound City, Illinois, preparing for further efforts against Vicksburg. On 6 February, she formed part of the expedition to Yazoo Pass and Greenville, operating there until 12 April. Then she and three other rams supported Colonel Charles R. Ellet's marine brigade in the Tennessee.

After Southern naval power on the rivers had been wiped out, Lioness was laid up at Mound City until sold in 1865. She served American commerce until sold abroad in 1873.

See also
Mississippi Marine Brigade

References

Lioness article at US Naval Historical Center
 

American Civil War patrol vessels of the United States
Ships of the United States Army
Paddle steamers of the United States
Ships built in Pittsburgh
United States Ram Fleet